Albert R. Ferrari (July 6, 1933 – May 2, 2016) was an American basketball player. At 6'4", and weighing 190 lbs, he played both at guard and forward. Born in New York City, he went to high school at Brooklyn Technical High School and after he attended college at Michigan State University. He was drafted by the St. Louis Hawks in the 3rd round (1st pick) of the 1955 NBA draft. In his six-season NBA career, he played for the Hawks and the Chicago Zephyrs.

For the 1957–58 NBA season he was not on the team's roster due to a commitment to military service.

Ferrari was an avid golfer, and consistently donated his time for the Whitey Herzog Youth Foundation Golf Scramble. He died on May 2, 2016, in St. Louis, Missouri, at the age of 82.

References

External links
Career stats @ basketball-reference.com

1933 births
2016 deaths
Basketball players from New York City
American men's basketball players
Chicago Zephyrs players
Guards (basketball)
Michigan State Spartans men's basketball players
Small forwards
St. Louis Hawks draft picks
St. Louis Hawks players